The 2008–09 PBA season was the 34th season of the Philippine Basketball Association. The season formally opened on October 4, 2008 and ended on July 17, 2009. This was the first time that the league will hold their opening ceremonies on a Saturday. The league started the season with the 2008-09 Philippine Cup, or the traditional All-Filipino Conference, while capping off the season with the import-laiden 2009 Fiesta Conference.

The first activity of the season was the 2008 PBA Draft last August 31 at the Market! Market! in Taguig.

Pre-season events

Broadcast contracts
The 2008-09 season would be the first season under the PBA's new broadcast contract with Solar Sports. Games would now air on their cable channel Basketball TV, and on the stations of the Radio Philippines Network (who curiously, were the first broadcaster of the PBA) after an intense bidding war between Solar and ABS-CBN.

Team re-brandings
The Welcoat Dragons became the Rain or Shine Elasto Painters (their last team name in the Philippine Basketball League).
The Magnolia Beverage Masters returned to their previous identity as the San Miguel Beermen.
The Talk 'N Text Phone Pals became the Talk 'N Text Tropang Texters.

Major trades
The Alaska Aces traded 6-foot-3 Veteran Forward Eddie Laure and 6-foot-1 Point Guard Solomon Mercado to Rain or Shine Elasto Painters for 6-foot-7 Forward Joe Devance.
The Air21 Express traded 6-foot-4 Forward Mark Borboran to Alaska Aces in exchange for 6-foot-6 Forward/Center J.R. Quiñahan.

Opening ceremonies
The season began on October 4 with the Talk 'N Text Tropang Texters defeating the Coca Cola Tigers, 98-97.

The muses for the participating teams are as follows:

2008-09 Philippine Cup

Elimination round

Playoffs

Finals

|}
Finals MVP: Mark Cardona (Talk 'N Text)
Best Player of the Conference: Willie Miller (Alaska Aces)

Smart Gilas exhibition games
Exhibition games were held prior to Games 4 and 6 of the Philippine Cup Finals between the Smart Gilas (Philippines team that will compete in the FIBA Asia Championship 2011) coached by Rajko Toroman and previously eliminated teams from the Philippine Cup. The games also marked the appearance of the newly renamed Burger King Titans team formerly known as the Air21 Express.

2009 Fiesta Conference

Notable events
Red Bull Barako changed their name to Barako Bull Energy Boosters.
The former Air21 Express were renamed as the Burger King Titans. However, with the failure of several business deals that would have changed the franchise's upper management, the Titans renamed into the Burger King Whoppers by their seventh game into the conference, retaining their old management headed by the Lina family.
The May 16 game between the Barangay Ginebra Kings and the Alaska Aces held at the Albay Astrodome in Legaspi was canceled when the playing court was judged as too slippery, with Ginebra leading 9–2, and 8:04 remaining in the first quarter. The game was stopped twice and the stoppages lasted two hours before the game was canceled. The game was restarted at the Araneta Coliseum on May 22.

Classification round

Playoffs

Finals

|}
Finals MVP: Jonas Villanueva (San Miguel)
Best Player of the Conference: Jayjay Helterbrand (Barangay Ginebra Kings)
Best Import of the Conference: Gabe Freeman (San Miguel Beermen)

Philippines-Australia goodwill series
An Australian team was invited to a two-game series between the national team, with the winner of a game being awarded P75,000 (about A$4,340).

2009 PBA All-Star Weekend

The 2009 PBA All-Star Weekend was held from April 22 to 26 at three different cities, particularly: Victorias, Negros Occidental (April 22), Panabo, Davao del Norte (April 24), and Quezon City (April 26). The winners were:

Obstacle Challenge: Paul Artadi (Barangay Ginebra Kings)
Three-point Shootout: James Yap (Purefoods Tender Juicy Giants)
Slam Dunk Competition: David Noel (Barangay Ginebra Kings)

All-Star Games

David Noel named the All-Star Game MVP.

Awards
Most Valuable Player: Jayjay Helterbrand (Barangay Ginebra)
Rookie of the Year: Gabe Norwood (Rain or Shine)
First Mythical Team:
Jayjay Helterbrand (Brgy. Ginebra)
Mark Cardona (Talk 'N Text)
Jay Washington (San Miguel)
Arwind Santos (Burger King)
Asi Taulava (Coca Cola)
Second Mythical Team:
Willie Miller (Alaska)
Dondon Hontiveros (San Miguel)
Gabe Norwood (Rain or Shine)
Jay-R Reyes (Rain or Shine)
Kelly Williams (Sta. Lucia)
All-Defensive Team:
Arwind Santos (Burger King)
Billy Mamaril (Brgy. Ginebra)
Asi Taulava (Coca Cola)
Wynne Arboleda (Burger King)
Ronald Tubid (Brgy. Ginebra)
Most Improved Player: Jonas Villanueva (San Miguel)
Sportsmanship Award: Ryan Reyes (Sta. Lucia)
Motolite Pangmatagalan Player of the Year: Willie Miller (Alaska)

Awards given by the PBA Press Corps
 Coach of the Year: Chot Reyes (Talk 'N Text)
 Mr. Quality Minutes: Jayson Castro (Talk 'N Text)
 Comeback Player of the Year: Mike Cortez (San Miguel)
 Executive of the Year: Danding Cojuangco (San Miguel)
 Referee of the Year: Throngy Aldaba
 Player of the Week Order of Merit: Arwind Santos (Burger King) / Jimmy Alapag (Talk 'N Text)
All-Rookie Team
Gabe Norwood (Rain or Shine)
Sol Mercado (Rain or Shine)
Bonbon Custodio (San Miguel)
Jared Dillinger (Talk 'N Text)
Larry Rodriguez (Barako Bull)

Cumulative standings

Elimination/classification rounds

Playoffs

References

External links
PBA.ph

 
PBA